Panoteriai  is a small town in Kaunas County in central Lithuania. As of 2011 it had a population of 360. There is a Catholic church (Church Panoteriai), a library, post office (LT-55085), as well as a cultural center.

References

This article was initially translated from the Lithuanian Wikipedia.

External links 
 Kaplice (Panoteriai) in the Geographical Dictionary of the Kingdom of Poland (1902)

Jonava District Municipality
Towns in Kaunas County